is a Japanese professional baseball catcher for the Fukuoka SoftBank Hawks of the Nippon Professional Baseball (NPB).

Professional career
On October 28, 2010, Kai was drafted by the Fukuoka Softbank Hawks as a developmental player in the 2010 Nippon Professional Baseball draft with Kodai Senga and Taisei Makihara.

2011-2015 season
In 2011–2013 season, he played in informal matches against the Shikoku Island League Plus's teams and amateur baseball teams, and played in the Western League of NPB's second league.

On November 21, 2013,  he re-signed a ¥5 million contract with the Fukuoka SoftBank Hawks as a registered player under control.

On June 7, 2014, Kai debuted in the Interleague play (NPB) against the Hiroshima Toyo Carp. And he was selected as the Japan Series roster in the 2014 Japan Series.

In 2015 season, although he played only one game, he was selected as the Japan Series roster in the 2015 Japan Series.

2016-2020 season
On June 16, 2016, Kai recorded his first hit and RBI with a Pinch hitter. In 2016 season, he finished the regular season in 13 games with a batting average of .167 and a RBI of 1.

In the 2017 season, Kai mainly teamed up with Young starter pitchers such as Kodai Senga, Nao Higashihama, Shuta Ishikawa and Yuki Matsumoto. On May 3, he recorded his first home run in the Grand Slam.  he finished the regular season in 103 games with a batting average of .232, a 5 home runs and a RBI of 18.

In the 2017 Japan Series, Kai and Senga's battery were the first to win the Japan Series as players who was drafted as a developmental squad player. On November 17, He won the 2017 Pacific League Mitsui Golden Glove Award and 2017 Pacific League Best Nine Award for the first time as a player drafted as a developmental squad player.

In the 2018 season, Kai finished the regular season in 133 games with a batting average of .213, a 7 home runs and a RBI of 37.

In the 2018 Japan Series, Kai set a Japan Series record with six consecutive caught stealings, and won the Japan Series Most Valuable Player Award. On November 29, he won the 2018 Pacific League Mitsui Golden Glove Award.

In the 2019 season, kai finished the regular season in 137 games with a batting average of .260, a 11 home runs and a RBI of 43, as a regular catcher of Hawks. On July 1, he as selected for the 2019 NPB All-Star game. On September 6, he supported Senga's No-hitter achievement as a catcher.

In the 2019 Japan Series,  he contributed to the team as a starting catcher, and Hawks achieved the third consecutive Japan Series Champion. On October 31, he was selected the 2019 Pacific League Mitsui Golden Glove Award.

In 2020 season, Kai changed his uniform number from 62 to Katsuya Nomura's Hawks era number 19. He supported the pitchers as a starter catcher and finished the regular season with a batting average of .211 and 11 home runs, 33 RBIs, 44 stolen bases and 22 sacrifice bunts in 104 games. As a Hawks catcher, he has recorded more than 10 home runs for the second consecutive year since Kenji Jojima, and 22 sacrifice hits were the most in the Pacific League in 2020. Kai played full innings in the postseason to support pitchers, and he recorded home runs in Game 2 and Game 3 and contributed to the team's fourth consecutive Japan Series champion in the 2020 Japan Series against the Yomiuri Giants. December 17, Kai was honored for the 4th Mitsui Golden Glove Award for 4 consecutive years, the 2nd Pacific League Best Nine Award for the first time in 3 years, and the Best Battery Award with Kodai Senga at the NPB AWARD 2020.

2021 season-present
In 2021 season, Kai played in all 143 games and finished regulation with a .227 batting average, 12 home runs and 44 RBI. He also had 26 Sacrifice bunt, a .999 Fielding percentage, a .452 Stealing base prevention percentage, and Assist 102, which led the league. On December 16, 2021, He was honored with a Pacific League Golden Glove Award for the fifth year in a row. On December 17, He renewed his contract with an estimated annual salary of 210 million yen, making him the highest paid active catcher.

On June 28, 2022, Kai tested positive for COVID-19 and was removed from the player registered by regulation, but returned on July 17. As a result, his appearances were reduced to 130 games, even though he was a regular catcher, and his batting average slumped to .180. However, his a 38 sacrifice bunts, the most in his career, were the highest in the league. On November 25, Kai won the Pacific League Golden Glove Award for the sixth consecutive year and the Pacific League Best Nine Award for the third time in two years, and was honored at the NPB Awards 2022.

International career 

Kai represented the Japan national baseball team in the 2018 MLB Japan All-Star Series and 2019 WBSC Premier12.

On October 12, 2017, he was selected as the Japan national baseball team in the 2017 Asia Professional Baseball Championship.

On October 10, 2018, he was selected to the 2018 MLB Japan All-Star Series. He was presented with a bat, Catcher's mitts, leggers and protector from Yadier Molina.

On October 1, 2019, he was selected as the Japan national baseball team to the 2019 WBSC Premier12.

On June 16, 2021, he was selected as the Japan national baseball team in the Baseball at the 2020 Summer Olympics. He appeared in four games and went 5-for-10, .500 batting average. And he didn't commit an error. On August 7, he was selected Tokyo 2020 All-Olympic Baseball Team (Best Nine Award) by the WBSC.

Kai represented the Japan national baseball team in the Samurai Japan Series 2022.

Skills profile
Kai's pop-time averaged 1.83 seconds ( Innings), the fastest recorded 1.73 seconds.

His strong throw is called Kai Cannon (甲斐キャノン). "Kai Cannon" is named after Gun Cannon appearing in Mobile Suit Gundam and its pilot Kai Shiden.

References

External links

 Career statistics - NPB.jp
19 Takuya Kai PLAYERS2022 - Fukuoka SoftBank Hawks Official site

1992 births
Living people
Fukuoka SoftBank Hawks players
Nippon Professional Baseball catchers
Baseball people from Ōita Prefecture
2019 WBSC Premier12 players
2023 World Baseball Classic players
Baseball players at the 2020 Summer Olympics
Olympic baseball players of Japan
Olympic medalists in baseball
Olympic gold medalists for Japan
Medalists at the 2020 Summer Olympics